The  was a Japanese railway line in Hyōgo Prefecture, between Yakujin Station in Kakogawa and Miki Station in Miki. This was the only railway line  operated. The line linked Miki and the West Japan Railway Company Kakogawa Line at Yakujin station.

Basic data
Distance: 
Gauge: 
Stations: 9
Track: Single
Power: Internal combustion (Diesel)
Railway signalling: Staff token

History
The  opened the line from 1916 to 1917.

Freight services ceased in 1974. The third sector (in Japanese sense) company was created and succeeded the line when Japanese National Railways abandoned the route in 1985.

The majority of commuters used Kobe Electric Railway's (Shintetsu) Ao Line to get to Kobe instead of the Miki–Kakogawa Line route. As a result, Miki Railway had been unable to justify continued financial support from the city. On March 1, 2007, the Miki City Council officially decided to abandon the line with the company agreeing on April 26, 2007. The line was closed on April 1, 2008. This was the fourth third-sector railway operator to cease operations, and the fifth third-sector line closed.

Stations

See also
List of railway companies in Japan
List of railway lines in Japan

External links 
 Interest Spots including Miki Rail-Bus, in Miki City Council English official website.
 Miki City Transport Policy Division from Miki City Council official website.

References
This article incorporates material from the corresponding article in the Japanese Wikipedia

Defunct railway companies of Japan
Rail transport in Hyōgo Prefecture
Railway companies established in 1985
Railway companies disestablished in 2008
1067 mm gauge railways in Japan
Japanese third-sector railway lines
1985 establishments in Japan